The Villa of Nero located south-east of the ancient site of Olympia, Greece is one of the ancient Roman villas built for the Roman emperor Nero in the 1st century AD. Some others were at Subiaco and Antium.

Archaeological excavations reveal the presence of a lead water pipe bearing the inscription "ner. aug.", an abbreviation of the name Nero Augustus.

See Also
 Domus Aurea

References

External links

Houses completed in the 1st century
Roman sites in Greece
Roman Olympia
Buildings and structures in Elis
Roman villa